Priacanthus tayenus, commonly known as purple-spotted bigeye, is a species of marine ray finned fish, a bigeye in the family Priacanthidae. It is native to the Indian and Pacific Oceans.

References

Fish described in 1846
Fish of Thailand
Fish of the Pacific Ocean
Fish of the Indian Ocean
tayenus